Andipatti Maharajan is an Indian politician and is Member of the Legislative Assembly of Tamil Nadu. He was elected to the Tamil Nadu legislative assembly as a Dravida Munnetra Kazhagam candidate from Andipatti Constituency in the by-election in 2019.

References 

Living people
Dravida Munnetra Kazhagam politicians
People from Theni district
Year of birth missing (living people)
Tamil Nadu MLAs 2021–2026